Ivan "Ivica" Horvat (16 July 1926 – 27 August 2012) was a Croatian professional football player and manager who capped for Yugoslavia. In 2004 he received the Croatian Olympic Committee's Matija Ljubek Award.

Playing career

Club
Horvat played from 1945 until 1957 for Dinamo Zagreb. In 1957 he moved to Germany to Eintracht Frankfurt, where he stayed until the end of his career.

International
In the Yugoslavia national team Horvat appeared from 1946 until 1956 in 60 fixtures. He took part in the World Cup in 1950 and 1954.

He also played with the Yugoslav team at the 1952 Summer Olympics in Helsinki and won the silver medal. In the final, Yugoslavia lost to the rising star of the 1950s, Hungary.

In the quarterfinals of the 1954 World Cup the Plavi lost due to an own goal from Horvat with 0–1. This goal was scored in the 10th minute and remained the fastest own goal in World Cup history until 2006 the Paraguayan Carlos Gamarra hit between his own posts against England after three minutes.

His final international was a November 1956 friendly match away against England.

Honours 
 Yugoslav champion: 1948, 1954
 Yugoslav Cup: 1951
 German champion: 1959
 Silver medal Olympic Games: 1952

Managerial career 
From 1961 until 1979 Horvat worked as manager, in the beginning as assistant at Eintracht Frankfurt and became successor of the manager legend Paul Oßwald in 1964. But Frankfurt could not convince in the Bundesliga and Horvat was sacked in 1965. He was succeeded by Elek Schwartz.

With Dinamo Zagreb he won the Inter-Cities Fairs Cup, the predecessor of the UEFA Cup, in 1967 in the final matches against Leeds United (2–0, 0–0) after previous manager Branko Zebec left club.

From 1971 he worked in the Bundesliga again, this time for FC Schalke 04, winning the DFB-Pokal in 1972 and becoming runner-up in the league.
In 1975 Horvat moved to Rot-Weiss Essen, he stayed there until September 1976.

In the beginning of the 1978–1979 Horvat returned to Schalke but due to the team's bad performances and an embarrassing derby loss against Bochum he was fired in March. Thereupon Horvat finished his managing career.

Honours 
 Inter-Cities Fairs Cup 1967
 DFB-Pokal 1972

References

External links
 
 Profile 
 Ivan Horvat at eintracht-archiv.de 

1926 births
2012 deaths
People from Sisak
Association football central defenders
Yugoslav footballers
Yugoslavia international footballers
1950 FIFA World Cup players
1954 FIFA World Cup players
Footballers at the 1952 Summer Olympics
Olympic footballers of Yugoslavia
Olympic silver medalists for Yugoslavia
Medalists at the 1952 Summer Olympics
Olympic medalists in football
GNK Dinamo Zagreb players
Eintracht Frankfurt players
Yugoslav First League players
Yugoslav expatriate footballers
Expatriate footballers in West Germany
Yugoslav expatriate sportspeople in West Germany
Yugoslav football managers
Eintracht Frankfurt managers
GNK Dinamo Zagreb managers
PAOK FC managers
FC Schalke 04 managers
Rot-Weiss Essen managers
Bundesliga managers
Yugoslav expatriate football managers
Expatriate football managers in West Germany
Expatriate football managers in Greece
Yugoslav expatriate sportspeople in Greece